Louis-Édouard-François-Desiré Pie (26 September 1815 – 18 May 1880), also referred to as Cardinal Pie, was a French Catholic bishop of Poitiers and cardinal, known for his ultramontanism and defence of the social reign of Christ the King.

Early life and seminary
Pie was born in Pontgouin in the diocese of Chartres on 26 September 1815, just after the Napoleonic Wars, between the Battle of Waterloo (18 June 1815) and the Treaty of Paris (20 November 1815). In 1835, Pie entered the seminary of St. Sulpice, where he remained for four years. He then continued his theological studies.

While developing a reputation for arguing the ultramontane cause against Gallican professors, the young priest developed a friendship with Abbé Lecomte, pastor of the Cathedral of Chartres. Abbé Lecomte, who had repeatedly refused episcopal appointment, was an ultramontane defender of papal infallibility, and a great admirer of the thought of Joseph de Maistre. Increasingly taking on the role of protector and spiritual father to Pie, Lecomte's death – which occurred on 31 December 1850 – was a very painful episode for Pie, who had risen at his relatively young age to occupancy of the see of Poitiers. He wrote the same day the brother of his deceased friend, Gabriel Lecomte: "I have no words, sir, and worthy friend, to express my excessive pain (...) I loved as a father, as a brother, as a unique friend, he for whom death came knocking. I can not stop the course of my tears, and yet still they are insufficient to unload my heart." Another man who played a leading role in the life of Abbé Pie was his bishop, Clausel Montale, who knew him as a seminarian and later as a young priest and vicar of Chartres. Bishop Montale had been the chaplain of Madame la Dauphine, Duchesse d'Angoulême, before being named bishop of Chartres.

Pie received the four minor orders in 1837 and was ordained deacon 9 June 1838.

Priest and bishop

The following year, 25 May 1839, Pie was ordained priest.

The "liberal king" (Louis Philippe) had been in power for almost nine years when the anti-liberal Father Pie began his pastoral ministry at Chartres. In his second year of priesthood, Pie was charged with the responsibility of giving the bishop's sermons in Lent, arguing the superiority of Christianity and the Christian life over liberal alternatives. In 1843, on 4 January, Bishop Montale appointed Father Pie his Vicar General. Thus he preached the Novena of the Assumption of 1846, taking as the theme of his sermons man's duty to return to God. These sermons violently attacked the French Revolution, during which had been established a conception of society based on human – and not divine – sovereignty. On 12 July of the same year, Father Pie wrote to M. de Estoile: "The neo-liberal Catholic party is a child of the Revolution and the Revolution is satanic in its essence."

Pope Pius IX appointed Pie to the episcopate on 28 September 1849, and he was consecrated on 25 November by Claude-Hippolyte Clausel Montale. He wrote after his appointment: "Everything has to be redone to create a Christian people: this will not happen by miracle or by a series of miracles especially, it will be through the priestly ministry, or it will not happen at all, and then society will perish." On 25 November, the day the Church celebrates Saint Catherine of Alexandria, patroness of philosophers and doctors, Archbishop Pie gave his first pastoral letter in Poitiers, on the same subject as so many of his most noted sermons: the return to, and restoration of all things in, Jesus Christ. As he would later write, "We will not change the essence of things; Jesus Christ is the cornerstone of the whole social order. Without him, everything collapses, everything becomes divided and perishes." (Cardinal Pie, Works, vol. II, p. 335)

At the First Vatican Council on 1869, Pie was the leading figure among the French for the definition of papal infallibility.

Cardinal and legacy

On 29 January 1879, Cardinal Nina, the Vatican Secretary of State, officially notified Pie of his elevation to the dignity of cardinal. He was created cardinal by Pope Leo XIII in the consistory of 12 May 1879 with the title of Cardinal Priest of St. Mary of Victories. He chose as his groomsmen to accompany him to Rome at the presentation of his cardinal's hat Charles Veillard, Charles Clémot, Gonzague de la Rochebrochard and Henry Savatier. He died a year later in his sixty-fifth year, on 18 May 1880 at Angoulême, where he had come to preach. He was buried in the crypt of Notre-Dame la Grande de Poitiers.

Rome had wanted, in making Pie a cardinal, to thank him for his work in France and at Vatican I. His major biographer was Louis Baunard (in his Histoire du cardinal Pie : évêque de Poitiers, H. Oudin, Poitiers, 1886) He would, years after his death, be favourably cited by Pope Pius X, who knews his writings well. His "Works" (pastoral letters, sermons, homilies, speeches, etc.) fill twelve volumes, and his social teaching has in recent years been enthusiastically promoted by members of the Society of St. Pius X.

Quotations
Jesus Christ has been constituted the King of kings. Yes - and the true glory, the true nobility of kings, ever since the preaching of the Gospel, has consisted in being the lieutenants of Jesus Christ on earth. Has the greatness of kings been diminished by the crosses glittering atop their diadems? Have their thrones been less renowned or less secure on account of their kingship being recognised as an emanation of, and participation in, the kingship of Jesus Christ? Jesus Christ is King, and the true dignity, the true liberty, the true emancipation of modern nations lies in their right to be governed in a Christian manner. Have such nations fallen short of their glory? Has their fate been less noble, less happy on account of their ruling sceptres being bound to submit to the sceptre of Jesus? Let it be repeated, brethren: Christianity does not reach its full development, its full maturity, where it does not take on a social character. Such is what Bossuet expressed in this way: 'Christ does not reign if his Church is not mistress, if the peoples cease to pay to Jesus Christ, to his doctrine, to his law, a national homage.' When the Christianity of a country is reduced to the bare proportions of the domestic life, when Christianity is no longer the soul of public life, of public power, of public institutions, then Jesus Christ deals with this country in the manner he is there dealt with. He continues to give his grace and his blessings to the individuals who serve him, but he abandons the institutions, the powers which do not serve him; and the institutions, the kings, the nations become like shifting sand in the desert, they fall away like the autumn leaves which are gone with the wind. (Cardinal Pie, Works, vol. II, pp. 259–60)
The main error, the capital crime of this century is the pretension of withdrawing public society from the government and the law of God... The principle laid at the basis of the whole modern social structure is atheism of the law and of the institutions. Let it be disguised under the names of abstention, neutrality, incompetence or even equal protection, let us even go to the length of denying it by some legislative dispositions for details or by accidental and secondary acts: the principle of the emancipation of the human society from the religious order remains at the bottom of things; it is the essence of what is called the new era. (Cardinal Pie, Pastoral Works, vol. VII, pp. 3, 100)
The time has not come for Jesus Christ to reign? Well, then the time has not come for governments to last. (Cardinal Pie, meeting with Emperor Napoleon III)

References

External links
Biography
Catholic Hierarchy page 

1815 births
1880 deaths
People from Eure-et-Loir
Bishops of Poitiers
19th-century French cardinals
Cardinals created by Pope Leo XIII